Cool Spring Park Historic District is a national historic district located at Wilmington, New Castle County, Delaware. It encompasses 316 contributing buildings, 3 contributing structures, and 3 contributing objects in located in and around Cool Spring Park in Wilmington.  It developed in the late-19th century as a middle class residential area.  They are primarily semi-detached dwellings in a variety of popular styles including Gothic Revival and Queen Anne.  Also located in the district is the Cool Spring Pumping Station associated with the Cool Spring Reservoir, Cool Spring Elementary School, and Knights of Pythias Hall.

It was added to the National Register of Historic Places in 1983.

Education
The housing on the 1000 block of Park Place is zoned to the Red Clay Consolidated School District. Zoned schools include William C. Lewis Dual Language Elementary School (K-5), Skyline Middle School (6-8), and Alexis I. du Pont High School.

References

Houses on the National Register of Historic Places in Delaware
Queen Anne architecture in Delaware
Gothic Revival architecture in Delaware
Historic districts in Wilmington, Delaware
Houses in New Castle County, Delaware
Historic districts on the National Register of Historic Places in Delaware
National Register of Historic Places in Wilmington, Delaware